Canada goose may refer to:
Canada goose, a bird species
Canada Goose (clothing), a clothing brand